Bryden is a rural locality in the Somerset Region, Queensland, Australia.

Geography 
The east of Bryden contains undeveloped bushland on the western slopes of the D'Aguilar Range.

History
The name Bryden comes from the name of the first settler in the area. The area was originally named Deep Creek.

Mount Brisbane Provisional School opened on 17 April 1876 in a bark hut built for free by Mr Carl Blank. There was an initial enrolment of 26 students with one teacher Mr Goodwin. In 1879, it became Mount Brisbane State School. In 1893, it was renamed Deep Creek State School. In 1930, it was renamed Bryden State School. From 1929 low students numbers caused a number of temporary closures, shared teacher arrangements with Dundas State School, and correspondence school arrangements. In 1936 all teaching ceased at the school. On 14 April 1947, the school reopened as Bryden Provisional School. It closed on 13 May 1963. It was on a  site on Loughrans Road.

On Sunday 19  August 1900, the foundation stone was laid for a Catholic church by Reverend Father Ryan. On Sunday 17 February 1901, the church was officially opened and dedicated as St Anne's Catholic Church by Ryan, as Archbishop Dunne was unable to attend. The church with a cemetery at the rear was on a  site at 2479 Wivenhoe Somerset Road (corner of Corcorans Road). The church is no longer extant but the cemetery remains.

On Sunday 18 December 1927, the Bryden Hall burned down after having been used on Saturday night. The new Bryden Hall was officially opened on Saturday 1 September 1928 by Ernest Grimstone, the local Member of the Queensland Legislative Assembly. In 1980, the hall was relocated to the Esk Showgrounds.

Heritage listings 
Bryden has a number of heritage-listed sites, including Castleholme Homestead along Bryden-Crossdale Road.

Education 
There are no school in Bryden. The nearest government primary schools are Fernvale State School in Fernvale to the south and Toogoolawah State School in Toogoolawah to the north-west. The nearest government secondary scahools are Lowood State High School in Lowood to the south and Toogoolawah State High School in Toogoolawah to the north-west.

Facilities

There is a Catholic cemetery 2479 Wivenhoe Somerset Road (corner of Corcorans Road) behind the former Catholic Church and adjacent to the Castleholme Homestead.

References

Suburbs of Somerset Region
Localities in Queensland